The following is a list of notable events and releases of the year 2013 in Swedish music.

Events

January

February

March

April

May

June
 27 – The 1st Bråvalla Festival opened near Norrköping (June 27 - 29).

July
 11 – SommarRock Svedala started (July 11 – 13).

August

September

October

November

December

Album and singles releases

January

February

March

April
 12 – Still Life with Eggplant by Motorpsycho and Reine Fiske.

May

June

July

August

September

October
 9 – Provenance by Anders Jormin and Christian Jormin (Footprint Records).

November

December

Unknown date
#

G –

See also
Sweden in the Eurovision Song Contest 2013
List of number-one singles and albums in Sweden (see 2013 section on page)

References

 
Swedish music by year
Swedish
music